The Hertford and Welwyn Junction Railway is a former railway in Hertfordshire, England, which merged in 1858 with the Luton, Dunstable and Welwyn Railway to form the Hertford, Luton and Dunstable Railway, which was then taken over by the Great Northern Railway in 1861.

The Hertfordshire and Welwyn Junction Railway company was formed on 25 June 1853. The line opened to goods traffic on 29 February 1858 and the first passenger services ran on 1 March 1858. The line connected Hertford Cowbridge railway station and Welwyn Junction railway station. There were stations at Hertingfordbury and Cole Green. Two halts, at Hatfield Hyde and Attimore Hall, were opened in 1905 and closed the same year.

The line was closed to passengers in 1951, the last scheduled train running on 18 June 1951.  The line was used for the shooting of several films until 1967. Goods services continued until 1962 and most of the track was lifted in June 1967, leaving a short stretch to serve two factories near the former Attimore Hall halt; this section was last used on 12 November 1981 and the track lifted soon afterwards.

The Cole Green Way footpath and cycle trail follows the track of the railway and forms part of Route 61 of the National Cycle Network.

References

External links
 Cole Green Way leaflet (pdf)

Rail transport in Hertfordshire
Closed railway lines in the East of England
1853 establishments in England